SUZ12 polycomb repressive complex 2 subunit pseudogene 1 is a protein that in humans is encoded by the SUZ12P1 gene.

References

Further reading 

Pseudogenes